Manfred Novotný was a Czechoslovakian luger who competed during the early 1960s. He won the bronze medal in the men's doubles event at the 1962 FIL World Luge Championships in Krynica, Poland.

References

External links
Hickok sports information on World champions in luge and skeleton.

Czechoslovak male lugers
Possibly living people
Year of birth missing